George Stephen Ferguson (August 22, 1952 – December 15, 2019) was a Canadian professional ice hockey centre who played 797 career National Hockey League games.

Career 
He was selected in the first round of the 1972 NHL Amateur Draft from the Toronto Marlboros. He later played for the Toronto Maple Leafs, Pittsburgh Penguins and Minnesota North Stars. Ferguson coached the Trenton Sting, a junior A level hockey team based in his hometown of Trenton, Ontario.

Personal life 
Ferguson died in 2019 at the age of 67.

Career statistics

References

External links

1952 births
2019 deaths
Ice hockey people from Ontario
Minnesota North Stars players
National Hockey League first-round draft picks
Oklahoma City Blazers (1965–1977) players
Oshawa Generals players
People from Quinte West
Pittsburgh Penguins players
Toronto Maple Leafs draft picks
Toronto Maple Leafs players
Toronto Marlboros players
Canadian expatriate ice hockey players in the United States
Canadian ice hockey centres